Christopher John Heintz (born August 6, 1974) is a former Major League Baseball catcher. He played with the Minnesota Twins from 2005–2007. He is currently a hitting coach for the GCL Philadelphia Phillies.  He is the brother of PGA Tour golfer Bob Heintz.

College career
Heintz attended the University of South Florida, where he played baseball for the Bulls.  While at South Florida, he was named to the All-Tournament Team of the 1996 Conference USA baseball tournament, in which South Florida finished second. He is a member of the USF Athletic Hall of Fame.

Minor League career
Heintz was drafted by the Chicago White Sox as a catcher in the 19th round of the 1996 Major League Baseball Draft. After six seasons in their farm system, the ChiSox released Heintz. At the end of the season, he became a rule 55 free agent, and signed with the Pittsburgh Pirates, and spent  with the Altoona Curve, also in the Eastern League.

MLB debut
His .304 batting average, eight home runs and 58 runs batted in in 2005 was good enough for a September call-up, and he made his major league debut on September 10, 2005, replacing Mike Redmond in the eighth inning of a 7–5 loss to the Cleveland Indians at Jacobs Field.

Heintz spent the next two seasons with Rochester making the occasional appearances with the major league roster. The Twins released Heintz following the  season. After one season with their triple A affiliate, the Norfolk Tides, Heintz retired. In 199.1 major league innings caught, Heintz had a 1.000 fielding percentage.

Coaching
During the  season, Heintz began coaching with the Twins' Midwest League affiliate, the Beloit Snappers. On October 20, 2009, he replaced Jake Mauer as manager of the Gulf Coast League Twins. He will also run the Twins' extended Spring Training.

At the start of the 2010 season, the South Florida Bulls baseball team hired Heintz as an assistant coach.

Heintz was named as the hitting coach for the GCL Phillies for the 2018 season.

References

External links

1974 births
Living people
Minnesota Twins players
Major League Baseball catchers
Baseball players from New York (state)
People from Syosset, New York
Minor league baseball managers
Bristol White Sox players
South Bend Silver Hawks players
South Florida Bulls baseball players
Hickory Crawdads players
Winston-Salem Warthogs players
Birmingham Barons players
Charlotte Knights players
New Haven Ravens players
Altoona Curve players
Rochester Red Wings players
Norfolk Tides players